A megaplex is a movie theater complex with many screens.

Megaplex may also refer to:
 Megaplex (album), an album by We Are Scientists
 Megaplex (convention), a furry convention held annually in Orlando, Florida
 Megaplex (General Jean Victor Allard Building), a building in Saint-Jean-sur-Richelieu, Quebec
 Megaplex Theatres, a chain of movie theaters in Sandy, Utah
 Virgin Megaplex, a movie theater chain in the United Kingdom
 A Win32 clone of Supaplex, itself a clone of Boulder Dash

See also
 Boston Sports Megaplex, a failed proposal for a sports complex in Boston